Washington Township is a township in Wapello County, Iowa, USA.

History
Established in 1844, Washington Township was the first township to be organized in Wapello County.

References

Townships in Wapello County, Iowa
Townships in Iowa